Danny Ragsdale (born February 19, 1977) is a former American football quarterback who played two seasons with the New York Dragons of the Arena Football League (AFL). He played college football at University of Redlands. He was also a member of the Bismarck Blaze, Iowa Barnstormers, Bismarck Roughriders, Utah Warriors and Billings Outlaws. He is president of Exclusive Insurance Brokerage, a life insurance general agency located in Westlake Village, California.

Early years and college career
Ragsdale played high school football at Daniel Murphy High School in Los Angeles, California.

Ragsdale played college football and baseball for the Redlands Bulldogs of the University of Redlands. He won the Gagliardi Trophy in 1999 for being Division III's most outstanding football player. He was a three-time All-SCIAC honoree, earned the John Zinda Award in 1998 and was named the SCIAC Offensive Player of the Year in 1999. Ragsdale was inducted into the University of Redlands Athletics Hall of Fame in 2013.

Professional career

Bismarck Blaze
Ragsdale played for the Bismarck Blaze of the Indoor Football League in 2000, helping the Blaze earn a playoff berth. He finished with six wins and one loss as the Blaze's starter. He completed 89 of 157 passes for 1,056 yards in nine games with the Blaze. He threw for 21 touchdowns with just six interceptions and finished fourth in the league with a passer rating of 94.9. Ragsdale also ran 25 times for 87 yards and eight touchdowns.

Iowa Barnstormers
Ragsdale was a member of the Iowa Barnstormers' practice squad late in the 2000 AFL season.

New York Dragons
Ragsdale played for the AFL's New York Dragons from 2001 to 2002. He backed up Aaron Garcia in 2001, throwing two touchdown passes in two games. He started the season opener for the Dragons in 2002, completing 13 of 24 passes for 129 yards, one touchdown and one interception as New York lost to the Los Angeles Avengers by a score of 43–25. Ragsdale was released by the Dragons on April 25, 2002.

Bismarck Roughriders
Ragsdale joined the Bismarck Roughriders of the National Indoor Football League (NIFL) in April 2002.

Utah Warriors
Ragsdale played for the Utah Warriors of the NIFL in 2003. He completed 341 of 505 passes during the regular season for 73 touchdown passes and 17 interceptions as the Warriors advanced to the Indoor Bowl.

Billings Outlaws
Ragsdale played for the NIFL's Billings Outlaws in 2004.

AFL statistics

Stats from ArenaFan:

Coaching career
Ragsdale served as assistant coach with the Stanford Cardinal in 2004, working with the defensive backs, before moving to another coaching job in 2005.

Personal life
Ragsdale is president and founder of Exclusive Insurance Brokerage, with headquarters located in Westlake Village, California. Exclusive Insurance Brokerage is a brokerage general agency that consults financial advisors across the United States.

References

External links
Just Sports Stats
Exclusive Insurance Brokerage
Bulldog Bench Hall of Fame: Danny Ragsdale '99

Living people
1977 births
Players of American football from Los Angeles
American football quarterbacks
Redlands Bulldogs football players
Redlands Bulldogs baseball players
Iowa Barnstormers players
Billings Outlaws players
New York Dragons players
Bismarck Roughriders players
National Indoor Football League players
Stanford Cardinal football coaches